RBG: Revolutionary but Gangsta is the second studio album by hip-hop duo dead prez. It was released March 30, 2004 on Sony Records.

RBG was described by M-1 as a movement that "comes off the back of the Honorable Marcus Garvey." According to him, "RBG means Red, Black and Green," the traditional African colors created by the UNIA, which are featured on the album cover. With this album Dead Prez "made it Revolutionary But Gangsta."

On RBG: Revolutionary but Gangsta, Dead Prez talks about ending poverty, the mental illness of depression, reliance on the government but of "pimping the system" as a means to this end and to the cause of liberation.  On "Hell Yeah," Dead Prez declares "Fuck welfare / we say reparations".

Inside the album liner notes, RBG is variously described as standing for; "revolutionary but gangsta", "real big guns", "real black girls", "ready to bust gats", "reaching bigger goals", "read 'bout Garvey", "rappers be gassed", "red black green", "rider's basic guide", and "rollin big ganja".

The song "Radio Freq" first appeared on Turn Off the Radio: The Mixtape Vol. 1 as "Turn Off the Radio" and is considered an homage to Ice Cube's song "Turn Off The Radio".

In 2003, the song, "Hell Yeah" was featured on the 2 Fast 2 Furious soundtrack.

Track listing

note tracks 13-19 are each five seconds of silence, and are followed by two more unlisted tracks, 20: "Twenty" (2:22) and 21: "Hell Yeah" (rock remix) (5:06)

Credits

Production 
 Stic.man – track 1, 2, 4, 6, 7, 8, 10, 11
 Tahir Jamal – track 3
 Dead Prez and Downbeat Production Collective – track 5, 12
 Sean Cane – track 9

References

External links 
 It’s Bigger than Hip Hop: An Interview with Mutulu Olugbala (M1) of Dead Prez

Dead Prez albums
2004 albums
Columbia Records albums